Natalia Rodríguez Martínez (born 2 June 1979) is a Spanish middle distance runner, who specializes in the 1500 metres. She was born in Tarragona, and represented Spain at the Summer Olympics in 2000, 2004, 2008 and 2012.

At the 2009 IAAF World Championships, Rodríguez initially finished first in the 1500 m, but was disqualified for tripping Gelete Burka. With 200 meters to go, Rodríguez thought she had a clear path to pass the Ethiopian runner on the inside, but when she attempted the pass, the pair collided and Burka crashed to the track.

Rodríguez won the silver medal at the 2010 IAAF World Indoor Championships, before going on to take the bronze medal outdoor at the 2010 European Athletics Championships.

She won the 2011 Cursa Bombers 10K race in Barcelona, although hot weather and a Catalan-only rule meant the race was uncompetitive.

Achievements

Personal bests
800 metres – 2:01.35  (2001)
1500 metres – 3:59.51 (2005)
Mile – 4:21.92 (2008)
3000 metres – 8:35.86 (2009)
5000 metres – 16:15.21 (2011)

References

External links

sports-reference

1979 births
Living people
Spanish female middle-distance runners
Athletes (track and field) at the 2000 Summer Olympics
Athletes (track and field) at the 2004 Summer Olympics
Athletes (track and field) at the 2008 Summer Olympics
Athletes (track and field) at the 2012 Summer Olympics
Olympic athletes of Spain
Sportspeople from Tarragona
World Athletics Championships medalists
European Athletics Championships medalists
21st-century Spanish women